Solmundella is a genus of hydrozoan in the family Solmundaeginidae. It is monotypic, with the single species Solmundella bitentaculata.

Distribution
This species is found in:
 Ross Sea, Antarctica.
 European waters 
 Gulf of Mexico 
 Kenya 
 New Zealand 
 North West Atlantic 
 Mediterranean Sea

Ecology 
Solmundella bitentaculata is an epipelagic and mesopelagic species. It feeds on the gastropod Limacina antarctica.

References 

Solmundaeginidae
Hydrozoan genera